SAC3 domain-containing protein 1 is a protein that in humans is encoded by the SAC3D1 gene.

References

Further reading